West Lodge is a Grade II listed house on the west side of Wimbledon Common, Wimbledon, London, built in 1894, and designed by E. J. May.

References

External links

Grade II listed buildings in the London Borough of Merton
Houses completed in 1894
Houses in the London Borough of Merton
Grade II listed houses in London